Steven C. Johnson (born December 30, 1960) is an American politician from the Democratic Party and is a current member of the Maryland House of Delegates representing District 34A.

Early life
Steven C. Johnson was born on December 30, 1960, in Garrison, Kentucky. Johnson attended Shady Spring High School, and Raleigh County Vocational Technical Center. Johnson served in the Army National Guard from 1977 to 1987. He owns Johnson Family Pharmacy in Aberdeen, Maryland. He served as an auxiliary police officer in Aberdeen from 2006 to 2016.

In the legislature
Johnson was sworn in as a member of the Maryland House of Delegates on January 9, 2019, representing District 34A. He is a member of the Health and Government Operations Committee (2019-), the Public Health and Minority Health Disparities Subcommittee (2019-), and the Government Operations and Health Facilities Subcommittee (2020-). He was a member of the Government Operations and Estates and Trusts Subcommittee in the 2019 General Assembly session.

Johnson has previously served as the Director of Economic Development in Aberdeen and has had multiple roles in Harford County, which he now represents.

Personal life
Johnson is married with three children.

References

External links

 
 
 
 

21st-century American politicians
Democratic Party members of the Maryland House of Delegates
Living people
1960 births